Laurie Graham,  (born March 30, 1960) is a former Canadian downhill skier.

Career
She  represented Canada at the 1980, 1984 and 1988 Winter Olympics. She won six World Cup victories and three National Downhill titles in her eleven years on the National Ski Team. She was the first North American woman to win a World Cup Super Giant Slalom skiing. She was the first North American to win on home soil at Mont-Tremblant, Quebec. In addition, Graham posted 34 top 10 FIS World Cup Downhill results.

In 1998, she was made a Member of the Order of Canada. She was inducted to the Canadian Ski Hall of Fame in 1991, the Canada's Sports Hall of Fame in 1993., and the Ontario Sports Hall of Fame in 2015. She graduated from the University of Toronto Schools.

References

External links
 
 

1960 births
Alpine skiers at the 1980 Winter Olympics
Alpine skiers at the 1984 Winter Olympics
Alpine skiers at the 1988 Winter Olympics
Canadian female alpine skiers
Living people
Members of the Order of Canada
Olympic alpine skiers of Canada
People from Orangeville, Ontario
Sportspeople from Ontario